Osbourn High School is a public school for grades 9–12 located in Manassas, Virginia, United States and the sole high school of the Manassas City Public Schools system.

History
Osbourn High School history goes back to 1890 when it was named the Manassas Institute. Miss Eugenia H. Osbourn came to Manassas and was named assistant principal. In 1908, the Institute became part of the Virginia Public School system and was renamed the Manassas Agricultural High School. In 1928, a new school was built on Lee Avenue and the school became Manassas High School. Ms. Eugenia Osbourn remained principal of this high school until 1935. In 1939, the school was renamed Osbourn High School in her honor. The building on Lee Avenue was home to Osbourn High School until the fall of 1953, when a new school was built on Tudor Lane. 22 years later, Prince William County Public Schools closed the building on Tudor Lane and students began attending a new school building on Euclid Avenue between Manassas and Manassas Park.

1975 was the year Manassas became a city. Shortly after, Manassas started its own school system. In the fall of 1977, the building at 9005 Tudor Lane reopened as Osbourn High School, a four-year high school. The eagle was chosen to be the school mascot, and navy blue and silver gray became the school colors. Due to Manassas's rapid growth, Grace E. Metz Junior High School opened in 1990 and Osbourn became a three-year high school (grades 10-12). On November 8, 1999, students and staff moved to the current Osbourn High School. The four-year status was restored, and the graduating 8th graders from Metz came to Osbourn in September 2000 and became the class of 2004.

Athletics
In 2006 the Osbourn Eagles football team won the Cedar Run District Title, The Northwest Region Title, the AAA Division 6 State Championship (the highest class in the state of Virginia) with a 42-20 victory of Chantilly High School. It is the school's only state championship since joining class AAA in 1996.

Notable alumni
Brandon Hogan (2007) - former NFL cornerback and return specialist for the Carolina Panthers; in 2014, signed with the Winnipeg Blue Bombers of the Canadian Football League
Lucky Whitehead (2011) - NFL wide receiver and return specialist for the New York Jets
George Zimmerman (2001) - Shot and killed Trayvon Martin in Sanford, Florida in 2012; charged with second-degree murder, he was found not guilty in a trial by jury the following year

References

External links
 Osbourn High School
 Manassas City Public Schools

Public high schools in Virginia
Buildings and structures in Manassas, Virginia
Educational institutions established in 1939
Northern Virginia Scholastic Hockey League teams
1939 establishments in Virginia